The mineral tramways trails are a series of trails located in mid west Cornwall, The trails are as follows:

Current trails
The Coast to Coast trail 17.5 km

From Devoran to Portreath following disused tramways

The Great Flat Lode trail 12 km

A circular trail encompassing much of the mining area to the south of Redruth and Camborne

The Tresavean trail 3 km

Proposed trails
The Tolgus trail

Connecting Redruth railway station to the coast to coast trail at Cambrose

The Redruth and Chasewater trail

The Portreath branchline trail

The Tehidy trail

Bibliography
 Acton, Bob - Exploring Cornwall's Tramway Trails, vol. 1: Great Flat Lode Trail, 1996, reprinted 2001, 
 Acton, Bob - Exploring Cornwall's Tramway Trails, vol. 2: Coast-to-coast Trail - Portreath to Devoran and Beyond, 1997, reprinted 2000,

External links

 Cornwall County Council's Mineral Tramways website: http://www.cornwall.gov.uk/default.aspx?page=13419

Cycleways in Cornwall
Rail trails in England